The Emlagh East Ogham Stone, also called the Priest's Stone (Cloch an tSagairt) is an ogham stone (CIIC 180) and a National Monument located in County Kerry, Ireland.

Location

Emlagh East ogham stone is located on the south end of Short Strand, near to Doonshean.

History

This stone was erected as a grave marker, with inscription in Primitive Irish, some time in c. AD 400–470, making it contemporary with Saint Patrick. Nearby is a flat stone named Lackshivaunnageelagh (Leac Shiobhán na nGeimhleach, "flagstone of Siobhán of the captives"), and there is a tradition of an old church at the strand and evidence for a graveyard found nearby. It originally stood in a field near the strand at Trabeg and was noted by Edward Lluyd in 1702; it was moved temporarily to Chute Hall about 1849 and now lies on a concrete base near its original location.

Description

The stone is grit, 239 × 61 × 28 cm. The inscription reads ᚛ᚁᚏᚒᚄᚉᚉᚑᚄᚋᚐᚊᚊᚔᚉᚐᚂᚔᚐᚉᚔ᚜
BRUSCCOS MAQQI CALIACỊ ("of Bruscus son of Cailech"). A cross is carved into the stone; it is not clear if it was put there before or after the inscription. The name Cailech appears in genealogical accounts of the Corcu Duibne.

References

National Monuments in County Kerry
Ogham inscriptions
Buildings and structures completed in the 5th century
5th-century inscriptions